João Fahrion (October 4, 1898 - August 11, 1970) was a Brazilian painter, engraver, draughtsman and illustrator.  He was born and died in Porto Alegre.

External links
 About João Fahrion (in Portuguese)

1898 births
1970 deaths
People from Porto Alegre
20th-century engravers
Brazilian engravers
Brazilian people of German descent
Brazilian illustrators
20th-century Brazilian painters
20th-century Brazilian male artists